Homedale may refer to:

Homedale, Idaho, USA
Homedale, New Zealand